Apantesis elongata is a moth of the  family Erebidae. It was described by Stretch in 1885. It is found in south-western British Columbia and west-central Alberta, south to Montana and Washington. It has also been recorded from north-eastern Oregon. The habitat consists of dry, montane, and subalpine meadows.

The length of the forewings is 14.9 mm. The ground colour of the forewings is brownish black. The hindwings are pale yellowish white in males and yellow in females. Adults are on wing from mid May to late August.

The larvae have been recorded feeding on Claytonia lanceolata.

This species was formerly a member of the genus Grammia, but was moved to Apantesis along with the other species of the genera Grammia, Holarctia, and Notarctia.

References

 Natural History Museum Lepidoptera generic names catalog

Arctiina
Moths described in 1885